The Falcón Family is a 1963 Argentine film.

Cast
Pedro Quartucci	
Elina Colomer
Roberto Escalada
Emilio Comte
Alberto Fernández de Rosa
Silvia Merlino
José Luis Mazza
Ovidio Fuentes	
Ubaldo Martínez	
Santiago Gómez Cou

External links
 

1963 films
Argentine black-and-white films
1960s Spanish-language films
Films directed by Román Viñoly Barreto
1960s Argentine films